Huncho Jack, Jack Huncho is the debut studio album by American hip hop duo Huncho Jack, which consists of American rappers Travis Scott and Quavo of Migos. The album was released on December 21, 2017 by Cactus Jack Records, Grand Hustle Records, Epic Records, Capitol Records, Motown, and Quality Control Music. It features guest appearances from fellow Migos members, Takeoff and Offset. Production was handled by Murda Beatz, Southside, and Frank Dukes, among others.

Huncho Jack, Jack Huncho charted at number three on the US Billboard 200, and received generally favorable reviews from critics.

Background
In December 2016, Quavo announced the collaborative album on Travis Scott's Apple Music Wav Radio show, previewing numerous recorded tracks. On April 3, 2017, it was further reported Scott had been working on a collaborative album with Atlanta-based rapper Quavo of Migos, with whom he previously worked with on the track "Oh My Dis Side" and the Young Thug collaboration "Pick Up the Phone". Speaking to GQ, he confirmed: "The Quavo album is coming soon. I'm dropping new music soon. You know how I do it though: I like surprises."

In an interview with Montreality published on September 18, 2017, Quavo stated that the collaborative album would be released "real soon". He also stated that he and Travis Scott have over 20 records ready. On December 7, 2017, a clip of Quavo being interviewed by Zane Lowe was posted on the official Twitter account for Beats 1. When asked about the title of their upcoming project, he confirmed it would be Huncho Jack, Jack Huncho.

Promotion
The artists teased the album in a series of tweets throughout 2017. The day before release a promotional poster for the album was spotted in New York City, followed by Quavo and Travis Scott posting cryptic messages to their social media before announcing that they were releasing Huncho Jack, Jack Huncho on December 22, 2017. The album's cover art and track listing was unveiled soon after. The album's artwork was illustrated by Ralph Steadman.

The music video for "Black & Chinese" was released on April 23, 2018.

Critical reception

Huncho Jack, Jack Huncho was met with generally favorable reviews. At Metacritic, which assigns a normalized rating out of 100 to reviews from professional publications, the album received an average score of 66, based on six reviews.

Brian Josephs of Pitchfork commended the album's exciting production, but criticized the performances of the artists: "But like any Travis Scott album, it's the sterling production that carries the project. The beats are as elegant as they are variegated. In a fatal irony, Huncho Jacks liveliness tends to come from everywhere except Quavo and Travis Scott. The protean energy that buoy their respective works are sadly absent." Aaron McKrell of HipHopDX stated that Huncho Jack, Jack Huncho is "an album that basks in each artists' signature sound to the benefit of its groove and detriment of its creativity" and "further proves the duo's strength is entertainment on cruise control".

Greg Whitt of Consequence said, "There is no palpable effort or discomfort on Huncho Jack, Jack Huncho, resulting in a perfectly fine album that no one will remember next year or maybe even next month". In a mixed review, The Guardians Ben Beaumont-Thomas stated: "Their often magnetic signature styles veer close to gimmickry here. ... But the production props them up strongly." In another mixed review, Sputnikmusic's Arcade stated: "A competent collaborative tape that nevertheless proves that Quavo should stick to Migos and Travis to curating his own albums."

Commercial performance
Huncho Jack, Jack Huncho debuted at number three on the US Billboard 200 with 90,000 album-equivalent units, of which 17,000 were pure album sales. It is Scott's third album to reach the top 10, and Quavo's first as a solo artist. The album was the duo's first number one on the US Top R&B/Hip-Hop Albums chart.

Track listing

Notes
  signifies a co-producer
  signifies an additional producer

Sample credits
 "Modern Slavery" contains a sample of "Cigarettes and Coffee", performed by Otis Redding.
 "How U Feel" contains a sample of "The Word II", performed by Shigeo Sekito.

Personnel
Credits adapted from Tidal.

Performers
 Travis Scott – primary artist
 Quavo – primary artist
 Takeoff – featured artist (track 3)
 Offset – featured artist (track 8)
 Yung Lean – additional vocals (track 8)

Technical
 Mike Dean – mastering engineer (all tracks), mixer (all tracks)
 Quavo – engineer (all tracks)
 Travis Scott – engineer (all tracks)
 Zach Steele – engineer tracks 1–4, 12)
 Jimmy Lepe – engineer (tracks 1–5, 8, 9, 12)
 DJ Durel – engineer (tracks 1–7, 9–13)
 Meeboob – assistant mixer (all tracks)
 Sean Solymar – assistant mixer (all tracks)
 Jess Jackson – engineer (tracks 5, 6, 13)

Additional personnel
 Ralph Steadman – cover artist

Production
 Buddah Bless – producer (tracks 1, 9)
 Southside – producer (tracks 2, 4)
 Murda Beatz – producer (tracks 3, 5, 6)
 Felix Leone – additional producer (track 3)
 TM88 – producer (track 4)
 Supah Mario – producer (track 4)
 Frank Dukes – producer (track 4)
 Mike Dean – co-producer (tracks 5, 9, 13)
 Illmind – co-producer (tracks 5, 6)
 Allen Ritter – additional producer (tracks 7, 10)
 Vinylz – producer (tracks 7, 8, 10)
 Cubeatz – producer (tracks 7, 10, 12)
 Yung Gud – additional producer (track 8)
 Yung Lean – additional producer (track 8)
 Oz – producer (track 8)
 Pas Beatz – producer (track 11)
 Yipsy – producer (track 11)
 Carlos Desrosiers – additional producer (track 11)
 C4 – producer (track 13)
 Cardo – producer (track 12)
 Wheezy – producer (track 13)

Charts

Weekly charts

Year-end charts

References

2017 albums
Epic Records albums
Grand Hustle Records albums
Collaborative albums
Travis Scott albums
Quavo albums
Albums produced by Cardo
Albums produced by Frank Dukes
Albums produced by Murda Beatz
Albums produced by Mike Dean (record producer)
Albums produced by Southside (record producer)
Albums produced by Travis Scott
Albums produced by Vinylz
Albums produced by Cubeatz
Quality Control Music albums
Motown albums
Albums produced by TM88
Cactus Jack Records albums